A pennysaver (or free ads paper, Friday Ad or shopper) is a free community periodical available in North America (typically weekly or monthly publications)  that advertises items for sale. Frequently pennysavers are actually called The Pennysaver (variants include Penny Saver, Penny-saver, PennySaver). It usually contains classified ads grouped into categories. Many pennysavers also offer local news and entertainment, as well as generic advice information, various syndicated or locally written columns on various topics of interest, limited comics and primetime TV listings.

The term is widely used in eastern North America from Ontario through New York, Pennsylvania, and Maryland, though there are pennysavers elsewhere. Pennysavers are sometimes published by a locally dominant daily newspaper as a brand extension of their publication and featuring advertisements published in the same style as the parent newspaper.

The PennySaver was a publication distributed in California. Formerly owned by Harte-Hanks, it and its website, PennySaverUSA.com, were sold to OpenGate Capital in 2013. The publication went out of business in May 2015.  OpenGate was subsequently sued for not providing proper notice before firing hundreds of employees.

In May 2016, a group of former PennySaver employees resurrected the publication in southern California's Inland Empire and northern Orange County.

In popular culture

In Donna Tart's novel The Secret History they mention the Peenysaver in chapter 7.

The Pennysaver plays a significant role in the 2007 film Juno, in which the main character, Juno, searches for adoptive parents for her unborn child in the publication.

In a Season 6 episode of The Golden Girls, Episode 18: "Older and Wiser," both Rose and Blanche are hired to model for a local pennysaver. The two begin to bicker over who has the prettier face and hands, but the joke is on them: When the pennysaver is delivered, they find out that they appear in an ad for beauty cream—as "before" models.

In a Season 3 episode of the CBS comedy Two and a Half Men, Episode 10: "Something Salty and Twisted", Alan Harper, played by Jon Cryer, has a feature article written of him titled "ALAN HARPER: Good Doctor, Good Neighbor, Good Guy." in the Tarzana PennySaver. It is revealed that to be featured in the article he had to buy advertisements in the paper.

In a Season 1 episode of the NBC comedy Save Me, Episode 6: "Heavenly Hostess", Beth Harper, played by Anne Heche, is told by God that she needs to have a garage sale. After multiple people start showing up to her address for a yard sale that was advertised in the PennySaver, she comes to the realization that God placed the ad in the PennySaver to make sure that she has her garage sale on that specific day.

In a Season 6 episode of the NBC comedy Parks and Recreation, Episode 3: "The Pawnee-Eagleton Tip Off Classic", Ron Swanson, played by Nick Offerman, receives the Pawnee PennySaver in the mail at his girlfriend's residence, which sends him on an overzealous quest to get off the grid. When Ron asks, “Who or what is PennySaver?”, Tom Haverford, played by Aziz Ansari, responds, “It’s a free circular with a bunch of coupons in it”.

In a Season 5 episode of the CBS drama NCIS: Los Angeles, Episode 13: "Allegiance", when Special Agent G. Callen and Special Agent Sam Hanna (played by Chris O’Donnell and LL Cool J) interview a suspect, they are surprised to find that he isn't a threat, but instead an ambitious entrepreneur wanting to get his brand out there with his chosen method, the PennySaver.

In a Season 1 episode of Young Sheldon, Episode 4: Sheldon is taken to a psychiatrist to overcome his fear of eating solid food. While he and his folks sit on the couch Sheldon's father ask him if he has got a coupon from the pennysaver, to save same money.

In the 2011 non-fiction book It Chooses You, author Miranda July interviewed thirteen PennySaver sellers in Los Angeles to create portraits of their surprisingly moving, profoundly specific realities.

References

Newspapers published in Canada
Newspapers published in the United States
Advertising